The 1899 municipal election was held December 11, 1899.  It was the first municipal election in which only a portion of the aldermen were to be elected; in 1898, three of the six aldermen elected were elected to two-year terms in preparation for a system in which only half of the aldermen would be up for election each year.  Kenneth McLeod, Alfred Jackson, and Kenneth W. MacKenzie were all only halfway through their two-year terms at the time of the election.  However, MacKenzie resigned in order to become mayor, leaving council with four vacancies.  Only three were filled by the election; council appointed Henry Goodridge to fill the fourth seat until the 1900 election.

Voter turnout

221 ballots were cast out of 613 eligible voters, for a turnout of 36.0%.

Results

(bold indicates elected, italics indicate incumbent)

Mayor

Kenneth W. MacKenzie was acclaimed as mayor.

Aldermen

Robert Lee - 156
Colin Strang - 147
Alfred Brown - 124

Information about defeated candidates for this election is no longer available.

Public school trustees

Matthew McCauley, William Short, Colin Strang, Alex Taylor, and Hedley C. Taylor were elected.  Detailed results are no longer available.

Separate (Catholic) school trustees

Nicolas Dubois Dominic Beck, Joseph Henri Picard, Antonio Prince, and Georges Roy were elected.  Detailed results are no longer available.

References

City of Edmonton: Edmonton Elections

1899
1899 elections in Canada
1899 in Alberta